"No Lookin' Back" is a song written by Michael McDonald, Kenny Loggins and Ed Sanford. The best-known version was recorded by American recording artist Michael McDonald and is the first single from his second solo studio album, No Lookin' Back (1985).

Track listing
 12" Single (Warner Bros. W 8960 T)
 "No Lookin' Back"
 "Don't Let Me Down"
 "I Gotta Try"

 7" Single (Warner Bros. 928 960-7)
"No Lookin' Back"
"Don't Let Me Down"

Personnel
Credits are adapted from the album's liner notes.

Musicians
 Michael McDonald – lead vocals; keyboards
 George Perilli – tom (drum) solo
 Jeff Porcaro – drums
 Willie Weeks – bass guitar
 David Pack – guitar

Chart performance

Kenny Loggins version
"No Lookin' Back" was originally recorded by co-writer Kenny Loggins and released on his 1985 solo studio album Vox Humana, four months prior to the McDonald version.

References

External links
 

1985 singles
1985 songs
Kenny Loggins songs
Michael McDonald (musician) songs
Songs written by Kenny Loggins
Songs written by Michael McDonald (musician)
Song recordings produced by Ted Templeman
Warner Records singles